This is a list of public art in the London Borough of Harrow.

Belmont

Edgware

Greenhill

Harrow

Harrow on the Hill

Pinner

Stanmore

Wealdstone

References

External links
 

Harrow
Harrow
Tourist attractions in the London Borough of Harrow